Frans Edward Elisabeth Grootjans (24 January 1922 – 20 February 1999), was a Belgian politician and minister for the PVV.

Grootjans was born at Wilrijk.  He became a licentiate in the trade and consular sciences and was chief editor and director of the newspaper De Nieuwe Gazet. He was a Municipal Council member (1971–1986) in Antwerp and a member of parliament (1954–1987) for the district Antwerp for the PVV. Grootjans was President of the PVV (1973–1977 and 1981–1982). He was minister of national education (1966–1968) and of finances and medium-sized business (1985). He was also President of the Flemish Council (1985–1987).  He remained in Antwerp for the rest of his life.

Honours 
 Grand officer in the Order of Leopold.
 Knight grand Cross in the Order of Leopold II.

References

Sources
Presidents of the Belgian liberal party
Terugblik in zorg en hoop. Frans Grootjans aan het woord, publication of the Willemsfonds and the Liberaal Vlaams Verbond with the support of the Liberaal Archief, 1990.

1922 births
1999 deaths
Belgian Ministers of State
People from Wilrijk
Ministers of Education of Belgium
Recipients of the Grand Cross of the Order of Leopold II
Finance ministers of Belgium